La Chapelle-Taillefert is a commune in the Creuse department in the Nouvelle-Aquitaine region in central France.

Geography

Population

Sights
 The church, dating from the twelfth century.
 The fourteenth-century stone cross.
 Remains of a hypogeum.
 A menhir.

Personalities
Victor Lanoux, comedian and writer, born 1936, lived here during the Second World War.

See also
Communes of the Creuse department

References

Communes of Creuse